Dr Frederik Paulsen Sr (born Friedrich Paulsen; 31 July 1909, in Dagebüll – 1997 in Alkersum) was a medical doctor and the founder of Ferring Pharmaceuticals.

Friedrich Paulsen was born in the tiny port hamlet of Dagebüll on the North Frisian coast. Both his parents originated from the neighbouring island of Föhr.

In 1933 during his studies in Kiel, Paulsen suffered harassment and threats from National Socialists due to his political beliefs. Therefore, he fled to Malmö, Sweden via Basel in Switzerland to avoid his internment at a concentration camp. In Sweden, whose citizen he became in 1941, he laid the foundation for the establishment of FERRING (1950) by his research on hormones and their synthentical production. He was one of the first people to synthesize the human hormones oxytocin and vasopressin. 

Upon accepting the Swedish citizenship he changed his given name Friedrich to Frederik. He and his first wife Margareta Liljequist had six children.

After his withdrawal from the company's management he retired to Alkersum, Föhr with his second wife, Eva. He became active in the preservation of the Frisian language and culture, and established the Ferring Stiftung in 1988. Frederik Paulsen died in Alkersum on Föhr on Jun 3 1997, aged 87. His youngest son, Frederik Paulsen Jr, is the current chairman of Ferring Pharmaceuticals.

References

Ferring Pharmaceuticals biography
 

1909 births
1997 deaths
Businesspeople in the pharmaceutical industry
Swedish pharmacists
20th-century Swedish businesspeople
North Frisians
Swedish people of Frisian descent
Swedish people of German descent
German Frisians